VMRDA Health Arena also known as  (Health Arena)  is an urban park in the city of Visakhapatnam. The park is located at the foot hill of the Kailasagiri with 2.km Jogging Track. the total area of the park is 20 acres and it was the first type of health park in Andhra Pradesh with the facilities of Yoga, Gym and cycle track .

References

External links
 

Parks in Visakhapatnam
Tourist attractions in Visakhapatnam